Patín a vela, also known as Patín catalán or Catalan catamaran , is a class of boat "one-design" of dinghy sailing with a single crew member. Characterized by being a catamaran with a single sail of type marconi without boom and the peculiarity of not having rudder nor centreboard. The steering of the boat is carried out with the movement and distribution of the weight of the skipper along the length and width of the deck of the ship and with the sheet, which holds the sail. It is specially designed to be used on the beach, this is the reason for not having centreboard or rudder.

History 
Designed by the Catalan brothers Mongé in 1942, it is the formal and advanced development of a concept that was born in the beach of Badalona at the first quarter of the century. At the beginning, there was no sail and the propulsion was done by rowing, but it was very rudimentary and heavy. Subsequently a mast was added. Finally the definitive creators of the class lightened it up and added the transversal steel bar conforming the boat exactly as we know it today.

It suffered minor modifications until the year 1943 when entered in the definition of monotip, starting to be known as "Patín a vela"  and after a certain period of time, finally has received the surname of "Patín catalán" (Catalan catamaran). Its basic characteristics are those of a catamaran and it's the only boat that is steered without a rudder; with a sail without battens and no boom. A simple and light sailing boat that is steered by displacing the skeeper's body over the length of the deck. What is most striking is its uniqueness, because nothing similar is known around the world. The history of this unique catamaran is linked to the existence of the Catalan coast, it is documented and recognized in the minutes of ADIPAV's board , in the chronicles of historians, in the bulletins of Club Natación Barcelona and others that reflect at the same time agreements referring to it as "Patín a Vela".

Constructive characteristics 

Its structure is made of plywood and solid wood, although some units are also manufactured in fiberglass. It is formed by two hulls (buoyancies) that fulfill the function of antiderivative planes. The hulls are linked together by the deck, composed of five independent "stands" (transversal planks) that provide rigidity to the structure and are used as a support for the rigging, as well as a support for the skipper.

Has a single mast of aluminum whose inclination and bending can be varied during the navigation by means of the stays. The triangular sail is maneuvered by a sheet that slides freely on a steel rod installed between two stands fully aft of the boat.

The fixing point of the maneuver lines is usually placed between two stands (from the 3rd to the 5th "stand") in a battery of mechanisms called "piano". In addition to the ropes that act as stays,. there is a halyard to hoist the sail along the mast, and another rope whose actuation shapes an area of the foot of the sail known as "dovetail ", when pulled or released lightly, makes an appreciable variation to the flatness of the sail surface.

Fleets 
Currently, the fleets of "Patín a vela" are distributed not only over Catalonia, Andalusia and Valencia, but also reach the French, Belgian and Dutch coasts.

 Patín a Vela Andalucía: SAPAV
 Class Patín a vela Belgium:

See also 

 Catamaran
 Outrigger canoe

References

External links

Catamarans